Ru Baru (English: Face-to-Face) is a Pakistani drama serial that aired on Hum TV. The show is written by Hoor Shumail, Produced by Momina Duraid, directed by Saife Hassan, and background music is done by Furqan and Imran. The drama serial premiered on 9 January 2014 in Pakistan, with the prime slot of 8:00 pm every Thursday on the channel Hum TV.

Summary
The story centers around Shabeeh and Tipu's marriage. Shabeeh lives with her grandmother and uncles after her parents pass away and is brought up by her maternal family. She marries her cousin's friend, Sarmad, who has severe mood swings and some psychological issues. She discovers that her mother had an affair with Sarmad's father and eventually became his step-mother. Tipu is in love with his cousin and marries her; Kiran becomes paranoid and suspicious about Tipu cheating on her which eventually leads to divorce. Then eventually Tipu and Kiran get back together again

Plot
Series explores the story of a girl Shabeeh (Syra Yousuf) who is an orphan and living with her maternal grandmother and her 2 uncles with their families. The drama starts with Tipu (Tipu Sharif) returning from Turkey after his graduation with his friend Sarmad (Faizan Khawaja). Tipu and Shabeeh are cousin and live in the same household.

Shabeeh is an introvert and spends her time in art work. Her cousins - Tipu and Kiran - love each other and want to get married, but her grandmother would like to see Shabeeh engaged before they marry. Her family receives a proposal from her uncle Jameel's friend's son - Usman - and they get engaged. One day, while visiting Tipu, Sarmad see Shabeeh and convinces Tipu that he likes her and wants to marry her. Tipu sees Sarmad as a better match for Shabeeh, and convinces his family to break off Shabeeh's engagement with Usman and to marry her to Sarmad.

After Shabeeh's marriage with Sarmad, she realizes that he has severe mood swings and has psychological issues. On their wedding night, he drags her out of the house and leaves her outside in the cold all night. Sarmad often wakes up screaming while sleeping and blames Shabeeh for ruining his life. One day, he eventually reveals to her that her mother had ruined her life and shows her pictures of her mother and his father together. Intrigued and confused, Shabeeh seeks Sarmad's uncle (khalu) and legal guardian, and asks him about Sarmad's parents.

The story goes in flashback, Taimoor (Sarmad's father) loves Neelam (Shabeeh's mother) who is his student in university in Turkey. Neelam struggles for what she wanted most in her life, Taimoor. Even though Taimoor was married and had a son, Neelam kept persuading him to leave his wife. Taimoor's Wife couldn't see him having an affair with Neelam so she becomes depressed. Neelam goes back to Pakistan and there her parents get to know her relationship with Taimoor, they are very upset because of this and her brother forces her to marry who ever will bring her a proposal. Neelam's mother tells him not to force her and wait for  better proposal but he doesn't agree and she is married right away to a not so good looking guy. She doesn't love him even though her husband loves and cares for her a lot. Taimoor decides to come to Pakistan because he couldn't live without Neelam and his wife becomes extremely depressed and becomes mentally disturbed and that is how she falls from upstairs and dies. After her death Taimoor tells Neelam to leave her husband and marry him. Initially, Neelam refuses as she is pregnant. Neelam very cleverly takes divorce and leaves her husband and marries Taimoor and leaves her new born daughter (Shabeeh) to her husband. On knowing this her husband commits suicide by shooting himself with a gun on his head and her child is given back to Neelam’ mother to care of her. Sarmad who is very young at the time, saw his mother dying in front of him and he becomes mentally disturbed and has mental issues. When Neelam lives with them her treatment with Sarmad is very harsh and it affects Sarmad and later he gets required to go to psychiatrist. Sarmd's father dies as Sarmad had planned to add poison in Neelam's tea but  father drinks it and dies. On seeing this Neelam kills herself by drinking the tea (which has poison). Sarmad in later years is brought up by his uncle. This was the story of Shabeeh's mother in the past and how Sarmad had become what he was in present. Shabeeh struggles and goes through a very hard time with Sarmad.

Cast
Syra Yousuf as Shabeeh and Neelam  
 Adnan Siddiqui as Taimoor (Sarmad's Father) 
Faizan Khawaja as Sarmad (Shabeeh's Husband)
Saba Faisal as Tipu's Mother
Behroze Sabzwari as Jameel (Tipu's Father/Shabeeh's Uncle)
Sultana Zafar as Jameel's mother (Shabeeh's Grandmother)
 Tipu Shareef as Tipu
Shameen Khan as Kiran
Tabassum Arif as Salima (Kiran's Mother) 
Mehwish Hayat as Seema (Sarmad's Mother) 
 Palwasha Yousuf as Annie
 Saleem Mairaj as Karam-din
 Madiha Imam as Neha (Sarmad's ex-Fiancé)
 Hanzala Shahid as Young Sarmad
 Atif Badar as Parvaiz (Shabeeh's Father)

References

External links 
 Hum TV official website

2014 Pakistani television series debuts
2014 Pakistani television series endings
Pakistani drama television series
Urdu-language television shows
Hum TV original programming